The X32 Digital Mixing Console is a digital mixing console conceived and designed by German manufacturer Behringer.  The console features 40-input channels, 25-bus, 32 XLR microphone input and 16 XLR output busses.  The console features 25 100mm motorised faders, a user assignable control panel, Ethernet connectivity and an iPad and iPhone control application.

Behringer announces that its X32 live/recording digital console will be arriving in stores on or before July 27, 2012.

References

External links

DIGITAL MIXER X32 at behringer.com.
Windows, Ubuntu & RaspberryPi tools and utilities for the X32

Audio electronics
Audio mixing
Consumer electronics
DJ equipment
Sound production technology